Charlene M. Lima (born August 18, 1953) is an American politician who is a Democratic member of the Rhode Island House of Representatives, representing the 14th district since 1993. During the 2009-2010 sessions, she served on the House Committees on Corporations, Separation of Powers, and Oversight. She also served as Chairperson of the Special House Commission to examine the issue of licensing of builders and contractors. Lima is currently the Deputy Speaker of the House.

References

External links
Rhode Island House - Representative Charlene Limaofficial RI House website

Democratic Party members of the Rhode Island House of Representatives
1953 births
Living people
Women state legislators in Rhode Island
Politicians from Cranston, Rhode Island
2008 United States presidential electors
21st-century American politicians
21st-century American women politicians